Tretyakovo Airport  is an airport in Lukhovitsy, Moscow Oblast, Russia located 25 km southeast of Kolomna and 56 km northwest of Ryazan.  The airport is operated by Russian Aircraft Corporation "MiG" as part of the Lukhovitsy Aircraft Production and Test Complex.

The production line for the Ilyushin Il-114-300 regional airliner, discontinued in Uzbekistan in 2012, has been established here after 2016, and the first testing plane was ready in 2021.

References

Airports built in the Soviet Union
Airports in Moscow Oblast